Gorgonidia helenae is a moth of the family Erebidae. It is found in Guatemala.

References

Phaegopterina
Moths described in 2012